Donald Kevin Faircloth (born 1948), is an English former athlete.

He represented England and won a bronze medal in the marathon, at the 1970 British Commonwealth Games in Edinburgh, Scotland.

References

1948 births
English male marathon runners
Commonwealth Games medallists in athletics
Commonwealth Games bronze medallists for England
Athletes (track and field) at the 1970 British Commonwealth Games
Living people
Medallists at the 1970 British Commonwealth Games